In the Battle of Villagarcia (also known as the Battle of Llerena) on 11 April 1812, British cavalry commanded by Lieutenant-General Sir Stapleton Cotton routed a French cavalry force led by  Charles Lallemand at the village of Villagarcia in the Peninsular War. Cotton intended to trap the French cavalry, which was separated by a number of miles from the main body of the French army, by executing simultaneous frontal and flank attacks. The plan came close to disaster when the forces making the frontal assault pushed forward prematurely.  The situation was saved by the timely arrival of John Le Marchant's force on the French left flank.

Background

The recent fall of the French occupied fortress city of Badajoz, on 6 April 1812, allowed the Anglo-Portuguese forces under Wellington to take the strategic offensive.  Prior to moving the bulk of his forces north where he would launch his Salamanca campaign Wellington entrusted a considerable proportion of his available cavalry to a force under General Sir Rowland Hill who was ordered to drive the retreating French army of Marshal Soult, who had failed in his attempt to relieve Badajoz, back into Andalusia to the south. The French rearguard under General D'Erlon were under orders to fall back towards Seville if pressed hard.  Hill's cavalry, under Sir Stapleton Cotton, were indeed pressing those French forces still remaining in the province of Extremadura hard.

Forces
Stapleton Cotton's cavalry consisted of John Le Marchant's heavy brigade (3rd and 4th Dragoons and 5th Dragoon Guards), John Slade's heavy brigade (1st Dragoons, and 3rd and 4th Dragoon Guards) and Frederick Ponsonby's (in temporary command due to General Anson's absence) light brigade (12th, 14th and 16th Light Dragoons). Only Ponsonby's brigade and the 5th Dragoon Guards were involved in the fighting.

The French cavalry force, attached to D'Erlon's two infantry divisions, commanded by General François "Charles" Lallemand was composed of the 2nd Hussars and the 17th and 27th Dragoons.

Battle

On the evening of 10 April 1811, General Cotton climbed the steeple of a church in Bienvenida. He knew that the French were occupying Llerena and saw that there were considerable numbers of French cavalry five miles closer to him near the village of Villagarcia. Cotton decided that he should attempt to trap the French cavalry with his superior forces.  During the night he despatched Ponsonby with the 12th and 14th Light Dragoons to probe the Villagarcia area, whilst Le Marchant was sent on a circuitous march to get on the French left flank and, it was hoped, cut off their retreat. Slade was also instructed to concentrate his brigade on Bienvenida, though he seems to have been tardy in moving. Cotton retained the 16th Light Dragoons as a reserve.  At some time during the night Cotton realised that Ponsonby's force might alert the French before Le Marchant was within striking distance and despatched an aide-de-camp with orders to halt the light cavalry; unfortunately the order arrived too late.

Two squadrons of the British light cavalry had forced the French vedettes out of the village of Villagarcia but, around dawn, had run into the full force of the French cavalry and were then chased back. Ponsonby subsequently found his two regiments faced by the three strong regiments under Lallemand and had to make a controlled withdrawal whilst skirmishing against heavy odds.

Following his orders, Le Marchant had moved his brigade though the night over tortuous terrain for a considerable distance. Coming down from rugged hills bordering the plain where the action was fought Le Marchant and the 5th Dragoon Guards had pulled considerably ahead of the other two regiments of the brigade. Le Marchant noticed, looking through the trees of the wood his men were moving through, that French cavalry, drawn up in two deep columns of squadrons, were pushing the six squadrons of light dragoons back towards a narrow ravine flanked by stone walls. Le Marchant realised that an immediate charge was needed, before Ponsonby's squadrons were forced into the congested and broken ground to their rear.

Lallemand, it is recorded, caught a glimpse of red-coated figures in the woods to his left and rode to alert General Peyremmont, who was leading the 2nd Hussars. Peyremmont scorned Lallemand's concerns, saying that the British dragoons were probably a small detachment who had lost their way.

At this point the advantage that the French had enjoyed in the action was suddenly reversed. Le Marchant led his dragoon guards out of the woods and they formed their ranks whilst accelerating into the charge. The 5th Dragoon Guards attacked with their squadrons in echelon, their left refused, and struck the deep and exposed left flank of the French formation to considerable effect. Simultaneously with Le Marchant's charge the 16th Light Dragoons, led by Cotton, appeared to Ponsonby's right-rear; they jumped a stone wall in line, and also charged. The French cavalry were thrown into instant confusion and were swiftly broken.

The British pursuit, continuing to inflict casualties and take prisoners, was conducted all the way back to the walls of Llerena where the bulk of D'Erlon's force was concentrated.  The French rallied briefly at a ditch halfway to Llerena, but they were outflanked by the 16th Light Dragoons and were forced into flight once more. A few hours later the French abandoned Llerena and continued their retreat out of Extremadura.

Results
The French lost 53 killed or wounded, plus 136 captured (including 4 officers - one a lt. colonel) and were induced to leave the province of Extremadura. The British lost 51 troopers killed or wounded.

Cotton had shown initiative in conceiving a plan to trap the French cavalry, however, the plan was wholly reliant on the timing of the movements on the flanks coinciding with those of the centre.  As a result, it was probably rather too complex and came dangerously close to breaking down in execution.  However, Cotton was flexible in extemporising once his original plan was rendered irrelevant when his central force made its presence known to the enemy too soon. Slade's heavy brigade did not make an appearance at all.

Le Marchant, in his first large-scale action as a general, proved himself as able a commander of cavalry in the field as he was a military innovator and educator.

Notes

References

External links
 

Battles of the Peninsular War
Battles of the Napoleonic Wars
Battles involving the United Kingdom
Battles involving France
Battle of Villagarcia
Battle of Villagarcia
April 1812 events